Gareth Pierce (born 19 February 1981) is a Welsh actor and musician who has appeared in various television series. In 2020, he began portraying Gavin Moss in BBC Radio 4's The Archers and became the second actor to play Todd Grimshaw in the ITV soap Coronation Street. In 2006, Pierce was named in the Top 50 most eligible bachelors list by Company Magazine.

Career
In 2008, Pierce and Matthew Wall founded the band Hafaliadau = Equations. Owain Taylor-Shaw joined in April 2008, followed by Mark Flanagan. Their debut album was released in November 2008.

Pierce is known for his roles as Osian James in the S4C TV-series Caerdydd (five series, 2006–2010) and Lenny Mack in Sky 1's Stella (two series, 2013–2014). He appeared in such S4C series as Y Gwyll, Cara Fi, Alys, Pen Talar, Cowbois ac Injans and soap Pobol y Cwm. He appeared in the second series of Y Pris in 2009 as skinhead Nicky. Further English-speaking appearances include Hinterland, Mr Selfridge, and Hollyoaks. 

In 2013, Pierce narratedall 11 episodes of “Doctor Who: The Doctors Revisited”, a documentary series in which each episode focused on an individual lead actor of Doctor Who in the run-up to the programme’s 50th anniversary in November of that year. He also played George of Clarence in The Globe's acclaimed production of Henry VI. In 2014, Pierce starred as Brian, the local GP, in the S4C romantic comedy-drama Cara Fi. In March 2016, it was announced Pierce would be joining the regular cast of BBC1's Ordinary Lies for its second series.

In 2020, Pierce played Gavin Moss, son of Philip Moss, in the BBC Radio 4 series The Archers. In August 2020, it was announced that Pierce has replaced Bruno Langley in the role of Todd Grimshaw in the ITV soap Coronation Street, Langley having been convicted for sexual assault in 2017.

Filmography

References

External links
 

1981 births
Living people
People from Gwynedd
Welsh drummers
Welsh male television actors
Welsh soap opera actors